The Studio Albums 1992–2011 is an eleven compact disc box set by American progressive metal/rock band Dream Theater, released by Roadrunner on July 8, 2014. It contains ten of the twelve WMG-era Dream Theater studio albums; as the title indicates, the box set spans the years from 1992 to 2011, and does not include the band's 1989 debut album When Dream and Day Unite or their self-titled twelfth studio album, which was released ten months before the box set. The albums are placed in chronological order.

Disc list
Disc 1: Images and Words
Disc 2: Awake
Disc 3: Falling into Infinity
Disc 4: Metropolis Pt. 2: Scenes from a Memory
Disc 5: Six Degrees of Inner Turbulence (disc 1)
Disc 6: Six Degrees of Inner Turbulence (disc 2)
Disc 7: Train of Thought
Disc 8: Octavarium
Disc 9: Systematic Chaos
Disc 10: Black Clouds & Silver Linings
Disc 11: A Dramatic Turn of Events

References

Dream Theater albums
2014 compilation albums
Roadrunner Records compilation albums
Reissue albums